Monor is a town in Pest county, Hungary. It is situated immediately southeast of Üllő municipality and Ferenc Liszt International Airport - southeast of Budapest. Monor has a railway station, light industry, and both a Roman Catholic and a Reformed church. Balassi Bálint utcai sporttelep is the local football arena.

References

External links 

  in Hungarian
 Street map 

Populated places in Pest County